Franklin is a borough in Sussex County, in the U.S. state of New Jersey. As of the 2020 United States census, the borough's population was 4,912, a decrease of 133 (−2.6%) from the 2010 census count of 5,045, which in turn reflected a decline of 115 (−2.2%) from the 5,160 counted in the 2000 census.

Franklin, known as the "Fluorescent Mineral Capital of the World," is located over a rich ore body containing more than 150 minerals, many of them fluorescent and 25 of which are found nowhere else on earth. Settled in the 17th century, the village known as Franklin Furnace after Benjamin Franklin, developed near iron mines and iron smelting operations located along the Wallkill River. In the early 19th century, zinc deposits in the area began to be developed commercially. For most of the century many small companies mined zinc and iron in the Franklin area. In 1897 all zinc mining efforts merged into the New Jersey Zinc Company, which was a major controlling factor in the development of Franklin. Immigrants from Russia, Britain, Hungary and Poland joined the work force at the mine. The population, 500 in 1897, had swelled to 3,000 by 1913. On March 18, 1913, the Borough of Franklin was incorporated from portions of Hardyston Township, based on the results of a referendum held on April 23, 1913.

Geography
According to the United States Census Bureau, the borough had a total area of 4.43 square miles (11.47 km2), including 4.36 square miles (11.28 km2) of land and 0.07 square miles (0.19 km2) of water (1.60%).

The borough borders the boroughs of Hamburg and Ogdensburg, as well as Sparta and Hardyston townships.

Franklin Furnace provides many examples of the complex mineralogy of the area.

Demographics

2010 census

The Census Bureau's 2006–2010 American Community Survey showed that (in 2010 inflation-adjusted dollars) median household income was $62,813 (with a margin of error of +/− $7,585) and the median family income was $81,875 (+/− $11,964). Males had a median income of $49,413 (+/− $8,152) versus $45,385 (+/− $9,926) for females. The per capita income for the borough was $29,708 (+/− $2,344). About 5.1% of families and 6.5% of the population were below the poverty line, including 6.4% of those under age 18 and 6.7% of those age 65 or over.

2000 census
As of the 2000 United States census there were 5,160 people, 1,898 households, and 1,324 families residing in the borough. The population density was 1,150.2 people per square mile (443.7/km2). There were 1,997 housing units at an average density of 445.1 per square mile (171.7/km2). The racial makeup of the borough was 95.10% White, 0.62% African American, 0.35% Native American, 1.47% Asian, 1.22% from other races, and 1.24% from two or more races. Hispanic or Latino of any race were 4.42% of the population.

There were 1,898 households, out of which 36.0% had children under the age of 18 living with them, 53.8% were married couples living together, 11.7% had a female householder with no husband present, and 30.2% were non-families. 24.1% of all households were made up of individuals, and 11.3% had someone living alone who was 65 years of age or older. The average household size was 2.69 and the average family size was 3.22.

In the borough the age distribution of the population shows 27.5% under the age of 18, 7.3% from 18 to 24, 31.8% from 25 to 44, 21.7% from 45 to 64, and 11.7% who were 65 years of age or older. The median age was 37 years. For every 100 females, there were 90.0 males. For every 100 females age 18 and over, there were 86.9 males.

The median income for a household in the borough was $44,985, and the median income for a family was $52,682. Males had a median income of $41,080 versus $26,201 for females. The per capita income for the borough was $19,386. About 5.6% of families and 7.0% of the population were below the poverty line, including 10.1% of those under age 18 and 9.9% of those age 65 or over.

Government

Local government
Franklin is governed under the Borough form of New Jersey municipal government, which is used in 218 municipalities (of the 564) statewide, making it the most common form of government in New Jersey. The governing body is comprised of the Mayor and the Borough Council, with all positions elected at-large on a partisan basis as part of the November general election. The Mayor is elected directly by the voters to a four-year term of office. The Borough Council is comprised of six members elected to serve three-year terms on a staggered basis, with two seats coming up for election each year in a three-year cycle. The Borough form of government used by Franklin is a "weak mayor / strong council" government in which council members act as the legislative body with the mayor presiding at meetings and voting only in the event of a tie. The mayor can veto ordinances subject to an override by a two-thirds majority vote of the council. The mayor makes committee and liaison assignments for council members, and most appointments are made by the mayor with the advice and consent of the council.

, the Mayor of Franklin Borough is Republican John M. Sowden IV, whose term of office ends December 31, 2023. Members of the Borough Council are Concetto Formica (R, 2022), Rachel Heath (R, 2024), Joseph Limon (R, 2023), John E. Postas (R, 2023), Stephen M. Skellenger (R, 2022) and Gilbert J. Snyder (R, 2024).

Federal, state and county representation
Franklin is located in the 5th Congressional District and is part of New Jersey's 24th state legislative district.

 

Sussex County is governed by a Board of County Commissioners whose five members are elected at-large in partisan elections on a staggered basis, with either one or two seats coming up for election each year. At an annual reorganization meeting held in the beginning of January, the board selects a Commissioner Director and Deputy Director from among its members, with day-to-day supervision of the operation of the county delegated to a County Administrator. , Sussex County's Commissioners are 
Commissioner Director Anthony Fasano (R, Hopatcong, term as commissioner and as commissioner director ends December 31, 2022), 
Deputy Director Chris Carney (R, Frankford Township, term as commissioner ends 2024; term as deputy director ends 2022), 
Dawn Fantasia (R, Franklin, 2024), 
Jill Space (R, Wantage Township, 2022; appointed to serve an unexpired term) and 
Herbert Yardley (R, Stillwater Township, 2023). In May 2022, Jill Space was appointed to fill the seat expiring in December 2022 that had been held by Sylvia Petillo until she resigned from office.

Constitutional officers elected on a countywide basis are 
County Clerk Jeffrey M. Parrott (R, Wantage Township, 2026),
Sheriff Michael F. Strada (R, Hampton Township, 2022) and 
Surrogate Gary R. Chiusano (R, Frankford Township, 2023). The County Administrator is Gregory V. Poff II, whose appointment expires in 2025.

Elections
As of March 2011, there were a total of 3,071 registered voters in Franklin, of which 469 (15.3% vs. 16.5% countywide) were registered as Democrats, 1,302 (42.4% vs. 39.3%) were registered as Republicans and 1,296 (42.2% vs. 44.1%) were registered as Unaffiliated. There were 4 voters registered as Libertarians or Greens. Among the borough's 2010 Census population, 60.9% (vs. 65.8% in Sussex County) were registered to vote, including 78.2% of those ages 18 and over (vs. 86.5% countywide).

In the 2012 presidential election, Republican Mitt Romney received 1,121 votes (57.2% vs. 59.4% countywide), ahead of Democrat Barack Obama with 772 votes (39.4% vs. 38.2%) and other candidates with 58 votes (3.0% vs. 2.1%), among the 1,959 ballots cast by the borough's 3,095 registered voters, for a turnout of 63.3% (vs. 68.3% in Sussex County). In the 2008 presidential election, Republican John McCain received 1,213 votes (57.2% vs. 59.2% countywide), ahead of Democrat Barack Obama with 857 votes (40.4% vs. 38.7%) and other candidates with 37 votes (1.7% vs. 1.5%), among the 2,122 ballots cast by the borough's 2,930 registered voters, for a turnout of 72.4% (vs. 76.9% in Sussex County). In the 2004 presidential election, Republican George W. Bush received 1,269 votes (63.4% vs. 63.9% countywide), ahead of Democrat John Kerry with 695 votes (34.7% vs. 34.4%) and other candidates with 28 votes (1.4% vs. 1.3%), among the 2,001 ballots cast by the borough's 2,740 registered voters, for a turnout of 73.0% (vs. 77.7% in the whole county).

In the 2013 gubernatorial election, Republican Chris Christie received 68.6% of the vote (841 cast), ahead of Democrat Barbara Buono with 27.7% (339 votes), and other candidates with 3.8% (46 votes), among the 1,242 ballots cast by the borough's 3,134 registered voters (16 ballots were spoiled), for a turnout of 39.6%. In the 2009 gubernatorial election, Republican Chris Christie received 870 votes (63.0% vs. 63.3% countywide), ahead of Democrat Jon Corzine with 361 votes (26.1% vs. 25.7%), Independent Chris Daggett with 116 votes (8.4% vs. 9.1%) and other candidates with 26 votes (1.9% vs. 1.3%), among the 1,382 ballots cast by the borough's 2,936 registered voters, yielding a 47.1% turnout (vs. 52.3% in the county).

Education
Students in public school for kindergarten through eighth grade attend the Franklin Borough School District. As of the 2018–19 school year, the district, comprised of one school, had an enrollment of 439 students and 47.6 classroom teachers (on an FTE basis), for a student–teacher ratio of 9.2:1.

For ninth through twelfth grades, public school students attend Wallkill Valley Regional High School which also serves students from Hamburg Borough, Hardyston Township and Ogdensburg Borough, and is part of the Wallkill Valley Regional High School District. As of the 2018–19 school year, the high school had an enrollment of 604 students and 56.0 classroom teachers (on an FTE basis), for a student–teacher ratio of 10.8:1. Seats on the high school district's nine-member board of education are allocated based on the populations of the constituent municipalities, with two seats assigned to Franklin.

Transportation

Roads and highways

The main highway providing service to Franklin is Route 23. County Route 517 also traverses the borough, mostly concurrent with Route 23.

Public transportation
The county provides Skylands Ride bus service operating between Sussex and Newton.

Media
 WSUS is a Class A radio station with an adult contemporary format serving the Sussex County area on 102.3 FM, owned by iHeartMedia and licensed to Franklin.

Notable people

People who were born in, residents of, or otherwise closely associated with Franklin include:
 Gertrude M. Clarke (1932-2020), science educator who primarily taught high school physics and nucleonics and extensively engaged in nuclear physics research.
 Alexandra Tillson Filer (1916–2015), metallurgist, mineral collector and bookseller
 Charles Joseph Fletcher (1922–2011), inventor and the owner / CEO of Technology General Corporation who developed an early version of the hovercraft
 Samuel Fowler (1779–1844), doctor, state legislator, and member of the United States House of Representatives who was one of the developers of the mines in the area
 Alfred B. Littell (1893–1970), politician who was mayor of Franklin in the 1950s, who also served as a member of both houses of the New Jersey Legislature and as President of the New Jersey Senate in 1951
 Robert Littell (1936–2014), politician, who served as a member of the New Jersey State Senate from 1992 to 2008
 Charles Francis Lynch (1884–1942), United States Attorney and a United States district court judge in New Jersey
 Alison Littell McHose (born 1965), politician who served in the New Jersey General Assembly from 2003 to 2015 until she was appointed as borough administrator
 Steve Nagy (1919–2016), pitcher who played for two MLB seasons for the Pittsburgh Pirates and Washington Senators, as part of a career that included 14 minor league seasons
 Steve Oroho (born 1958), politician, who has served in the New Jersey Senate since 2008, where he represents the 24th Legislative District

References

Further reading
 Jones Jr., Robert W. Nature's Hidden Rainbows : The Fluorescent Minerals of Franklin, New Jersey (San Gabriel, California: Ultra-Violet Products, Inc., 1964).
 McCabe, Wayne T. and Kate Gordon. A Penny A View...An Album of Postcard Views...Franklin, N.J. (Newton, New Jersey: Historic Preservation Alternatives, 2000).
 Truran, William R. Franklin, Hamburg, Ogdensburg, and Hardyston (Images of America). (Charleston, South Carolina: Arcadia Publishing, 2004).

External links

 Franklin Borough website
 Franklin Borough School District
 
 School Data for the Franklin Borough School District, National Center for Education Statistics
 The Advertiser-News, community newspaper

 
1913 establishments in New Jersey
Borough form of New Jersey government
Boroughs in Sussex County, New Jersey
Populated places established in 1913
Wallkill River
Geological type localities